Honora Josephine Yvonne Scannell was Professor of Environmental Law in Trinity College, Dublin Law School, Ireland. She received a master's degree from Cambridge University and a doctorate from Trinity College, Dublin.

As well as lecturing, she works as a consultant in Environmental, Planning and Climate Change Law at the Arthur Cox law firm in Dublin, a post that she has held since April 1990. She is also currently a director on the boards of Tara Mines, Coillte and CIE She  has written the leading textbook in Ireland on that subject. She is a qualified barrister in King's Inns. She received the Spirit of Columbus Award for her Contribution to the Environment in 1994 and was the Francis E Lewis scholar at the Washington and Lee University School of Law, in Virginia, USA in 1996. She is widely published in a number of peer-reviewed journals including the Irish Planning and Environmental Journal.
She campaigned with her fellow professor Ivana Bacik against the proposed amendment to the Irish Constitution in 2002 which would have removed suicide as a grounds for abortion.

Publications

Books 

 Environmental and Land Use Law (Thomson Round Hall) (Brehon Series) (2005)
 Environmental and Planning Law, Irish Academic Press, 1995
 The Habitats Directive in Ireland (with Clarke, Cannon, Doyle) (Centre for Environmental Policy and Law) (1999. Reprinted 2000).
 Ireland, International Encyclopaedia of Laws, The Hague, Kluwer, 1994, 
 The Law and Practice Relating to Pollution Control in Ireland, (2nd ed.) London, Graham and Trotman, 1982, 
 The Law and Practice Relating to Pollution Control in Ireland, London, Graham and Trotman,

References 

Year of birth missing (living people)
Living people
20th-century Irish people
21st-century Irish people
Irish barristers
Environmental lawyers
Environmental law in Ireland
Academics of Trinity College Dublin
Alumni of the University of Cambridge
Alumni of Trinity College Dublin
Irish women lawyers
Alumni of King's Inns